Gold(I) sulfide is the inorganic compound with the formula . It is the principal sulfide of gold. It decomposes to gold metal and elemental sulfur, illustrating the "nobility" of gold.

Structure and preparation
The compound crystallizes in the motif seen for cuprous oxide: gold is 2-coordinate, sulfur 4-coordinate, and the S-Au-S linkage is linear. Linear coordination geometry is typical of gold(I) compounds, e.g. the coordination complex chloro(dimethyl sulfide)gold(I). The structure is similar to the α form of silver sulfide (argentite), which only exists at high temperatures.

It can be prepared by treating gold chloride with hydrogen sulfide It also arises by sulfiding dicyanoaurate:

This product is described as "initially dark reddish-brown" solid that turns "steel-gray".

References

Sulfides
Gold(I) compounds
Gold–sulfur compounds